Andrew Balls is PIMCO's Chief Investment Officer for Global Fixed Income.  He is a former Financial Times journalist. He is younger brother to the former UK Shadow Chancellor and former government minister, Ed Balls.

He graduated from Oxford University and Harvard Kennedy School.

References

External links 

 Andrew Balls PIMCO Profile

Ed Balls
British economists
Year of birth missing (living people)
Living people
British business and financial journalists
PIMCO
Alumni of the University of Oxford
Harvard Kennedy School alumni
Chief investment officers